Nature's Web: Rethinking Our Place on Earth is a 1992 book by Peter Marshall on the history of the environmental movement. Its original subtitle, "An Exploration of Ecological Thinking", was renamed in its 1994 Paragon House printing.

References

Bibliography

External links 

 
 Full text from the Internet Archive

1992 non-fiction books
English-language books
History books about the 20th century
Environment and society
Simon & Schuster books